Men's Giant Slalom World Cup 1967/1968

Calendar

Note: Round 3/Race 8 was the Olympic event, which counts also for the World Cup. See also 1968 Winter Olympics and Alpine skiing at the 1968 Winter Olympics

Final point standings

In Men's Giant Slalom World Cup 1967/68 the best 3 results count.

Men's giant slalom
FIS Alpine Ski World Cup men's giant slalom discipline titles